The 2000 Samoa rugby union tour of Scotland and Wales was a series of matches played in November 2000 in Scotland and Wales by Samoa national rugby union team.

Results 

Scores and results list Samoa's points tally first.

References

2000 rugby union tours
2000
rugby union
2000 in Oceanian rugby union
2000–01 in British rugby union
2000–01 in Welsh rugby union
2000–01 in Scottish rugby union
2000
2000
2000